George Weed Wallace (May 25, 1872 – May 22, 1946) was a Second Lieutenant in the United States Army and a Medal of Honor recipient for his actions in the Philippine–American War. Wallace later rose to the rank of lieutenant colonel, and retired in 1919. He is buried at San Francisco National Cemetery.

Medal of Honor citation
Rank and organization: Second Lieutenant, 9th U.S. Infantry. Place and date: At Tinuba, Luzon, Philippine Islands, March 4, 1900. Entered service at: Denver, Colo. Birth: Fort Riley, Kans. Date of issue: June 25, 1900.

Citation:

With another officer and a native Filipino, was shot at from an ambush, the other officer falling severely wounded. 2d Lt. Wallace fired in the direction of the enemy, put them to rout, removed the wounded officer from the path, returned to the town, a mile distant, and summoned assistance from his command.

See also

List of Philippine–American War Medal of Honor recipients

References

 

1872 births
1946 deaths
United States Army Medal of Honor recipients
United States Army officers
People from Fort Riley, Kansas
American military personnel of the Philippine–American War
Philippine–American War recipients of the Medal of Honor
Burials at San Francisco National Cemetery